John Ronan Connolly (born July 6, 1973) is an American politician, former lawyer, and educator from Massachusetts. He served from 2008 to 2014 as an at-large member of the Boston City Council, and was an unsuccessful candidate in the 2013 Boston mayoral election.

Early life and family 
Connolly was born in the Roslindale neighborhood of Boston, Massachusetts. Connolly comes from a politically connected family; his mother, Lynda Connolly, served as a Massachusetts court judge and his father, Michael J. Connolly, is a former Massachusetts Secretary of the Commonwealth. During his high school years, Connolly attended Roxbury Latin School. After graduating he earned his B.A. cum laude from Harvard University and later earned his J.D. from Boston College Law School.

Political career

Boston City Council

Connolly won an at-large seat on the Boston City Council in the November 2007 election. During the campaign, his campaign office admitted to mailing literature about incumbent councilor Stephen J. Murphy that came from an unknown source. The acknowledgement came after a Boston Herald columnist accused the candidate of sending the unsigned, unattributed flyers. Connolly took office in January 2008. He was successfully re-elected in the November 2009 and November 2011 elections.

Connolly was best known as a councilor for his work in relation to education. In 2011, Connolly uncovered the fact that there was expired food in freezers at Boston schools when he made surprise visits to four schools' cafeterias. In 2012, he was the only vote on the City Council against the teachers' contract, opposing the fact that it did not extend the school day. Also in 2012, Connolly supported legislation proposed in the Massachusetts Senate for school reform.

Connolly also did a notable amount of work as a councilor related to environmental matters.

In 2009, Connolly proposed a measure imposing term limits on the city's mayor and city councilors. However, the Boston City Council rejected the measure.

2013 mayoral campaign

Connolly was a candidate in the 2013 Boston mayoral election. Connolly finished second of 12 candidates in the preliminary election in September 2013, behind State Representative Marty Walsh. On November 5, 2013, Connolly lost the general election to Walsh.

Connolly announced his candidacy on February 26, 2013. At the time, many in the city believed that incumbent mayor Thomas Menino would be seeking a sixth term. On March 27, 2013, Menino announced that he would not be seeking election, changing the dynamics of the race, making it the first open-race for Boston mayor in thirty years.

Connolly framed himself as an education-focused candidate, making improving Boston Public Schools the central issue of his campaign. He had even announced his candidacy at the city's Brighton High School.

Connolly was endorsed by both of the city's major newspapers' editorial boards. In the primary, the editorial board of The Boston Globe made a dual-endorsement of both Connolly and John Barros. In the general election, the editorial board of The Boston Globe, again, endorsed Connolly. In the primary, the editorial board of the Boston Herald made a dual endorsement of both Connolly and Daniel F. Conley. In the general election, the editorial board of the Boston Herald again endorsed Connolly.

In early October, polls had Connolly leading the race. But by mid-October, polls showed the race having narrowed significantly.

Among factors credited for his loss in the mayoral general election was a last-minute half-million dollars in television advertising against Connolly and in support of Wash, funded by the Boston Teachers Union. Connolly was a supporter of charter schools, and his education reform proposals had run into opposition from the union.

Subsequent political involvement
Connolly founded the nonprofit 1647.

In 2018, Connolly was appointed by acting Massachusetts education commissioner Jeff Wulson to the state-appointed board overseeing the public schools by Lawrence, Massachusetts.

Connolly was involved with "Better Boston PAC", which supported Andrea Campbell's unsuccessful campaign in the 2021 Boston mayoral election primary.

Electoral history

City Council

Mayor

References

External links 
Official City of Boston Website for John Connolly
John Connolly for Mayor of Boston Campaign Website
 

1973 births
20th-century American educators
21st-century American educators
21st-century American politicians
21st-century American lawyers
Boston City Council members
Boston College Law School alumni
Harvard University alumni
Living people
Massachusetts lawyers
Roxbury Latin School alumni
People from West Roxbury, Boston